Gary J Van Berkel, born in 1959, is the research scientist who led the Organic and Biological Mass Spectrometry Group at Oak Ridge National Laboratory until his retirement from there in 2018.  He is currently owner and CSO of Van Berkel Ventures, LLC, an analytical measurement science, innovation, research, consulting and writing firm in Oak Ridge, TN.

He is best known for his research on electrochemistry of electrosprays.

Early life and education 
 1982 B.A. Lawrence University
 1987 Ph.D. Washington State University

Research interests 
 Electrochemistry of electrospray
 Atmospheric pressure surface sampling and ionization
 Mass spectrometry imaging

Awards 
 2016 R&D 100 Award "Open Port Sampling Interfaces for Mass Spectrometry"
 2014 Battelle "Inventor of the Year"
 2013 Oak Ridge National Laboratory "Scientist of the Year"
 2013 Oak Ridge National Laboratory "Inventor of the Year"
 2013 Rapid Communications in Mass Spectrometry Beynon Prize
 2010 R&D 100 Award "Liquid Microjunction Surface Sampling Probe for Mass Spectrometry"
 2005 Biemann Medal

References

21st-century American chemists
Mass spectrometrists
Living people
Lawrence University alumni
Year of birth missing (living people)